Major Major were an English indie rock band from Liverpool, England.

History 
On 4 January 2008, Major Major became the first band to perform at the Liverpool Echo Arena, where they supported The Farm in front of ambassadors for European Capital of Culture 2008. 

The group reached the final of Now That's What We Call Culture on 8 August 2008, which was held at the Liverpool Echo Arena. The band reached the final after progressing through heats judged by Phil Redmond and Jennifer Ellison.

Glastonbury 2009 
Major Major became the first confirmed act for Glastonbury Festival 2009, after winning the Rockstar Bands competition on 5 September 2008.  The competition was backed by the Glastonbury Festival organiser Michael Eavis and Peter Gabriel. As winners of the competition, they also played a live set at the Pilton Equinox Party on Friday 18 September – along with Franz Ferdinand and The Ting Tings.

Band members 
Conor Clarke – Vocals and guitar
Neil Owen – Lead guitar and vocals
Louis Cooper – Bass guitar and vocals
James Knight – Drums

Track listing

References

English indie rock groups